Arab al-Zubayd was a Palestinian village in the Safad Subdistrict. It was depopulated during the 1947–1948 Civil War in Mandatory Palestine on April 20, 1948, when the villagers fled on hearing the intentions of The Palmach's First Battalion of Operation Yiftach.  It was located 15 km northeast of Safad, near the al-Mutilla-Safad—Tiberias highway.

History
In 1838,  in the Ottoman era,   ez-Zubeid was noted as  an Arab tribe, within the Government of Safad.

British Mandate era
In the 1922 census of Palestine conducted by the British Mandate authorities, Arab Zubaid  had a population of 257; 255  Muslims 
and 2 Melkite Christians, increasing in the 1931 census, when it was counted together with Al-'Ulmaniyya, to 432; 5 Christians and 427  Muslims,  in  a total of 100  houses.

The population, combined with that of Mallaha, came to 890 Muslims in the  1945 statistics,  with a total of 2,168 dunams of land.  

The village had many springs for its water source, and farming was the main occupation. In 1944–45 a total of 1,761 dunums was allocated to cereal farming. while 20 dunams were classified as built-up land.

1948 war and depopulation
Israeli historian Benny Morris has found evidence that the population fled on 20 April (prior to the occupation of any of the neighboring villages), anticipating an Israeli attack. In August 1948, Golani Brigade units were preparing to blow up the village in spite of a complaint from the nearby Kibbutz Sha’ar ha-’Amaqim, who objected. Prime Minister David Ben-Gurion denied responsibility, saying: "No permission was given by me or to any commander to destroy houses." The village was nevertheless destroyed.

In 1992 the village site was described: "All that remains of ‘Ara al-Zubayed is scattered rubble, buried under a thicket of woods, grass, and thorny plants. Irrigation works tap the village’s water resources.  Animals graze in the mountainous portions of the land near the site.  Some land in the plain that borders the site has been converted into an Israeli nature reserve, while the rest is cultivated by Israeli farmers."

Notes and references

Bibliography

External links
Welcome To 'Arab al-Zubayd
'Arab al-Zubayd, Zochrot
'Arab al-Zubayd at Khalil Sakakini Cultural Center
'Arab al-Zubayd, Dr. Khalil Rizk.
Survey of Western Palestine, Map 4: IAA, Wikimedia commons

Arab villages depopulated during the 1948 Arab–Israeli War
District of Safad